Cyanophrys is a genus of butterflies in the family Lycaenidae erected by William J. Clench in 1961. The species of this genus are found in the Nearctic and Neotropical realms.

Species
Cyanophrys acaste (Prittwitz, 1865)
Cyanophrys agricolor (Butler & H. Druce, 1872)
Cyanophrys amyntor (Cramer, [1775])
Cyanophrys argentinensis (Clench, 1946)
Cyanophrys banosensis (Clench, 1944)
Cyanophrys bertha (E. D. Jones, 1912)
Cyanophrys crethona (Hewitson, 1874)
Cyanophrys fusius (Godman & Salvin, [1887])
Cyanophrys goodsoni (Clench, 1946)
Cyanophrys herodotus (Fabricius, 1793)
Cyanophrys longula (Hewitson, 1868)
Cyanophrys miserabilis (Clench, 1946)
Cyanophrys pseudolongula (Clench, 1944)
Cyanophrys remus (Hewitson, 1868)
Cyanophrys roraimiensis Johnson & Smith, 1993
Cyanophrys velezi Johnson & Kruse, 1997

External links

Sources

 
Eumaeini
Lycaenidae of South America
Lycaenidae genera
Taxa named by William J. Clench
Taxonomy articles created by Polbot